Vishwamitra was an Indian television series, which aired in 1989, produced and directed by Dasari Narayana Rao. The dialogues for the show were written by the Urdu poet Rahi Masoom Raza who previously wrote dialogues for Mahabharat.

The show had its original run on DD National.

Plot  
The story of show follows the character of Kshatriya King Vishwarath becoming a Brahmarishi Vishwamitra the sage after a feud with Sage Vashishtha over the divine cow Nandini.

Cast

Episodes

Music 
Lyrics for various songs were written by Bhring Tupkari and music was composed by Vasu Rao. The title song was performed by Yesudas.

Trivia
1. Bhanupriya and Shantipriya , who played the reel-life mother-daughter in the serial, are real-life sisters.

References

External links 
 

Television series based on the Ramayana
1995 Indian television series debuts
Doordarshan original programming
Hindi-language television shows